Klajdi Toska (born 4 May 1994) is an Albanian footballer who plays for Greek lower league side Tilikratis as a defender.

Club career
He spent a few months with Laçi in the Albanian Superliga.

References

External links
 Profile - FSHF

1994 births
Living people
Sportspeople from Berat
Association football defenders
Albanian footballers
KF Laçi players
Tilikratis F.C. players
Kategoria Superiore players
Albanian expatriate footballers
Expatriate footballers in Greece
Albanian expatriate sportspeople in Greece